Jean-Pierre Gosse (May 14, 1924 – June 6, 2001) was a Belgian biologist and ichthyologist.

Life and career 
Gosse was a biologist with the Royal Belgian Institute of Natural Sciences.

Gosse went on missions in South America with Leopold III of Belgium.

Gosse described the following species:

 Cichlasoma lyonsi, 1966 (Amphilophus)
 Geophagus wavrini, 1963 (Biotodoma)
 Geophagus harreri, 1976 (Geophagus)

 Pterophyllum leopoldi, 1963 (Pterophyllum)
 Retroculus septentrionalis, 1971 (Retroculus)
 Retroculus xinguensis, 1971 (Retroculus)

Taxon described by him
See :Category:Taxa named by Jean-Pierre Gosse

Taxon named in his honor 
Lethrinops gossei W. E. Burgess & H. R. Axelrod, 1973

References

External links 
 Jean-Pierre Gosse at ZooBank
 Jean-Pierre Gosse at WorldCat
 Jean-Pierre Gosse at IdRef

1924 births
2001 deaths
Belgian biologists
Belgian ichthyologists
Place of birth missing